Zaprudskoye is a rural locality (a selo) and the administrative center of Zaprudskoye Rural Settlement, Kashirsky District, Voronezh Oblast, Russia. The population was 768 as of 2010. There are 10 streets.

Geography 
Zaprudskoye is located 18 km southeast of Kashirskoye (the district's administrative centre) by road. Krasny Log is the nearest rural locality.

References 

Rural localities in Kashirsky District, Voronezh Oblast